Kamal Indrajith (born 3 February 1977) is a Sri Lankan former cricketer. He was a right-handed batsman and right-arm medium-pace bowler who played for Moors Sports Club. He was born in Colombo.

Indrajith made a single first-class appearance for the side, during the 1995–96 season, against Sinhalese Sports Club. From the tailend, he scored 1 not out in the first innings in which he batted, and 0 not out in the second. Indrajith bowled 3 overs in the match, conceding 20 runs.

He is now an umpire and stood in matches in the 2017–18 SLC Twenty20 Tournament in Sri Lanka.

References

External links
Kamal Indrajith at Cricket Archive

1977 births
Living people
Sri Lankan cricketers
Sri Lankan cricket umpires
Moors Sports Club cricketers